Muhamad bin Mustafa is a Malaysian politician who has served as a Senator since 2017 to 2020 and Member of Dewan Rakyat for Peringat from 1999 to 2004. He is a member of PAS.

Election results

References

Living people
1958 births
People from Kelantan
Malaysian people of Malay descent
Malaysian Muslims
Malaysian Islamic Party politicians
Members of the Dewan Rakyat
Members of the Kelantan State Legislative Assembly
Members of the Dewan Negara